Sprayberry High School  is a public high school located in northeastern Cobb County in Marietta, Georgia, United States, a north-northwestern suburb of metro Atlanta. It is a comprehensive senior high school (grades 9–12) with approximately 1700 students. It opened in 1952  and moved to its current location at 2525 Sandy Plains Road in 1973.  Sprayberry is a microcosm of Cobb County in that it serves students from a variety of ethnic groups, religions, socio-economic levels, and academic abilities   Middle schools feeding upcoming students into Sprayberry are McCleskey, Daniell, and Simpson in the Cobb County School District. The school's teams are called the Yellowjackets.

History 
Sprayberry High School opened to students the day after Labor Day in 1952. It was founded in the building now occupied by The Walker School (a private school), on Cobb Parkway (U.S. 41) at the north corner of Allgood Road.

Sprayberry is now located on the west corner of Sandy Plains Road at Piedmont Road.  The exposed-aggregate concrete and dark brick of the original building is an example of the brutalist architecture common at the time.

Since then, the area historically known as Sandy Plains has now come to be known as Sprayberry, stretching somewhat northeast from the intersection to Post Oak Tritt Road, and to the Sprayberry post office at Ebenezer Road. Several strip malls and other businesses bear the name.

The campus football stadium was one of a few local schools' used in filming Remember the Titans, released in 2000.

Academics 
Sprayberry High School is known for its academics and programs in the arts. It has been named a National School of Excellence and Georgia School of Excellence twice, an accomplishment made by only two other schools. It has been recognized by Newsweek  and the Washington Post as one of the top 5% of high schools in the nation five years in a row. The school's SAT and ACT scores have remained well above the national average, with students continuously achieving above state average scores in all GHSGT subject areas. Georgia High School Graduation Test scores in the 2010–2011 school year were the highest in school history. Sprayberry has met AYP for the past eight years, and since 2005, Sprayberry has been a Demonstration level Advanced Placement Certified School with over 20 Advanced Placement courses.

Sports 
 Baseball
 Boys' basketball
 Girls' basketball 
 Cheerleading
 Cross country
 Fast pitch softball
 Football -  2008 7AAAA Region Champions
 Golf
 Boys' lacrosse
 Girls' lacrosse 
 Soccer
 Swimming
 Tennis
 Track
 Volleyball
 Wrestling

Sprayberry High School's football stadium (Jim Frazier Stadium) was used in part of the movie Remember the Titans.

Music 
Band of Gold
Orchestra
Chorus

Sprayberry High School's band program has also hosted the Southern Invitational Music Festival. Marching bands from all across the Southeast compete and perform while Sprayberry performs in exhibition.

Publications 
 Sprayberry's Vox Humana

Notable alumni 
 Marcus Bagwell - professional wrestler (Class of 1988)
 Kris Benson - baseball player, Baltimore Orioles
 Rodrigo Blankenship - football player Arizona Cardinals
 Marlon Byrd - baseball player, Philadelphia Phillies
 Michael Chavis - baseball player, Pittsburgh Pirates
 Costaki Economopoulos - comedian
 Michelle Malone - musician
 Christopher Martin - Principal Trumpet, Chicago Symphony Orchestra
 Jerick McKinnon - football player, Kansas City Chiefs
 Jim Nash - baseball player, Kansas City Athletics
 Chuck Nevitt - former NBA player
 Ty Pennington - TV personality
 Jimmy Rave - professional wrestler
 Rick Richards - lead guitarist of the Georgia Satellites and the Ju-Ju Hounds
 Parvati Shallow - contestant on Survivor: Cook Islands and Survivor: Micronesia
 Brynden Trawick - former football player, Tennessee Titans
 Travis Tritt - country musician
 Austin Watson - professional wrestler for the WWE under the ring name Xavier Woods (Class of 2004)
 Kevin Young - Assistant Coach for the Phoenix Suns in the NBA
 Jabari Zuniga - former NFL player, New York Jets
 Trey Sermon - NFL running back for the Philadelphia Eagles

References

External links
 Sprayberry High School website

Public high schools in Georgia (U.S. state)
Educational institutions established in 1952
Schools in Cobb County, Georgia
1952 establishments in Georgia (U.S. state)